Little River State Beach is a protected beach of California, United States, in Humboldt County. The  park was established in 1931.

The site is a broad, open beach that contains sand dunes.  The Little River forms the north boundary of the beach.  It is open for day-use only, but the adjacent Clam Beach County Park provides camping.

See also
List of beaches in California
List of California state parks

References

External links 

Little River State Beach

1931 establishments in California
California State Beaches
Parks in Humboldt County, California
Protected areas established in 1931
Beaches of Humboldt County, California
Beaches of Northern California